Braceville can refer to:
Braceville Township, Grundy County, Illinois
Braceville, Illinois, a village within Braceville Township
Braceville Township, Trumbull County, Ohio